Craig Driver (born September 21, 1988) is an American professional baseball coach who currently is the game strategy and catching coach for the Chicago Cubs of Major League Baseball (MLB).

Career
Driver attended Nathan Hale High School in Seattle, Washington, where he played baseball and basketball for the Raiders. Driver played four years of college baseball as a catcher; first at Columbia Basin College for one year, and then at the University of Puget Sound for his final three years.

Driver began his coaching career at the University of Puget Sound, serving as a catching coach, first base coach, and recruiter for the 2011–2012 season. Driver spent the 2012–2013 and 2013–2014 seasons at Central Washington University as a graduate assistant coach. He returned to Puget Sound for the 2014–2015 and 2015–2016 seasons as the athletic recruitment coordinator and head assistant coach. Driver then spent the 2016–2017 season at Yale University, serving as their catching coach.

Driver began his professional coaching career with the Philadelphia Phillies, serving as their bullpen catcher and receiving coach in 2018 and 2019.

Driver was hired by the Chicago Cubs as their first base and catching coach prior to the 2020 season.

Personal life
Driver graduated from the University of Puget Sound with a degree in business and a minor in mathematics, and completed a master's degree in athletic administration at Central Washington University.

References

External links
Philadelphia Phillies coach bio
Yale Bulldogs bio
Puget Sound Loggers bio

Living people
Baseball coaches from Washington (state)
Baseball players from Washington (state)
Baseball catchers
Major League Baseball bullpen catchers
Philadelphia Phillies coaches
Columbia Basin Hawks baseball players
Puget Sound Loggers baseball players
Puget Sound Loggers baseball coaches
Central Washington Wildcats baseball coaches
Yale Bulldogs baseball coaches
University of Puget Sound alumni
Central Washington University alumni
1988 births